Balduin Schilling (11 March 1868 – 15 December 1929) was a German architect. His work was part of the architecture event in the art competition at the 1928 Summer Olympics.

References

1868 births
1929 deaths
19th-century German architects
20th-century German architects
Olympic competitors in art competitions
People from Elberfeld
Road incident deaths in Germany
Architects from Wuppertal